The Third Degree is a lost 1913 silent film melodrama directed by Barry O'Neil  and produced by the Lubin Manufacturing Company. It was based on the 1909 Broadway play by Charles Klein.

Cast
Gaston Bell - Howard Jeffries, Jr.
Robert Dunbar - Howard Jeffries, Sr.
Carlotta Doti - Annie Jeffries
Robert Whittier - Robert Underwood
George Soule Spencer - Richard Brewster
Lila Leslie - Mrs. Howard Jeffries, Sr. (*as Lilie Leslie)
Bartley McCullum - Captain Clinton
Bernard Siegel - Dr. Bernstein
Robert Graham - Bellboy

References

External links
 The Third Degree at IMDb.com
lobby poster

1913 films
American silent feature films
American black-and-white films
Lost American films
Lubin Manufacturing Company films
Melodrama films
Silent American drama films
1913 drama films
Films directed by Barry O'Neil
American films based on plays
1913 lost films
Lost drama films
1910s American films